The United States Army Old Guard Fife and Drum Corps is one of four premier musical organizations of the United States Army. Members perform using musical instruments and wearing uniforms similar to those used by military musicians of the Continental Army during the American Revolution.

It is the only unit of its kind in the United States' armed forces, and is part of the 3rd U.S. Infantry ("The Old Guard"). The Fife and Drum Corps has been stationed at Fort Myer, Virginia, since its founding on February 23, 1960.

In 2022, February 18th was named “The United States Army Old Guard Fife and Drum Corps Day” in Spanish Fort, Alabama.

Musicians

The musicians of this unit recall the fifes and drums from the days of the American Revolution as they perform in uniforms patterned after those worn by the musicians of Gen. George Washington's Continental Army. Military musicians of the period wore the reverse colors of the regiments to which they were assigned. The uniforms worn by the members of the Corps are dated circa 1781, and consist of black tricorn hats, white wigs, waistcoats, colonial coveralls, and red regimental coats. The 69-member Corps uses 10-hole fifes, handmade rope-tensioned drums and single-valve bugles, which bring to life the exciting sounds of the Continental Army.

The Troop Step
Perhaps the most distinctive signature of the musicians of this unit is the troop step, reminiscent of the ceremonial steps of the Household Regiments of the British Army. While playing their instruments, the musicians march forward at a slow, ceremonial pace, while pointing their toes, toe touching the ground first. After these troop steps, typically, the Fife and Drum Corps changes back to normal pace, stepping off at normal step, playing Yankee Doodle, to the applause of the crowds.

Drum Major
The drum major of the unit is distinguished from the other musicians by his headgear, the light-infantry Cap. In contrast to modern Army bands, and as an indication of prominence, he carries an espontoon instead of the standard mace. The espontoon is an 18th-century weapon carried by officers. However, it is used by the drum major to issue silent commands to the Corps.

Performances

As an official representative of the U.S. Army, the Corps averages over 500 performances annually. The Corps has entertained millions of people in major parades, pageants and historical celebrations throughout the United States; and has served America as a goodwill ambassador as far away as Europe, Australia and Canada. Major sporting events the Corps has performed at include NCAA bowl games, NBA games, NFL games (including Super Bowls), the Kentucky Derby, the Indianapolis 500, and the 1980 Winter Olympics in Lake Placid, New York.

In support of the President of the United States, the Corps performs at armed forces arrival ceremonies for visiting dignitaries and heads of state at the White House, and has participated in every presidential inaugural parade since President John F. Kennedy's in 1961. The Corps also performed at the funeral of Kennedy. Today both men and women are members of the unit.

Instruments
The Corps personnel play fifes, bugles, and drums (snares and basses). Obtaining the instruments posed a challenge, as only a few manufacturers produce historical instruments. A batch of 20 drums were produced in Basel, Switzerland, home to the Carnival of Basel, where a long tradition of marching drums and piccolo flutes is alive. Their fifes were built in Switzerland by Skip Healy of the Healy Flute Company, a professional musician and U.S. ex-pat.

Gallery

See also
 Corps of Drums
 U.S. Army Herald Trumpets
 Commander-in-Chief's Guard (3rd Infantry Regiment)

References
 Abbott James A., and Elaine M. Rice. Designing Camelot: The Kennedy White House Restoration. Van Nostrand Reinhold: 1998. .
 Clinton, Hillary Rodham. An Invitation to the White House: At Home with History. Simon & Schuster: 2000. .
 Garrett, Wendell. Our Changing White House. Northeastern University Press: 1995. .

External links 
 

Bands of the United States Army
Ceremonial units of the United States military
Presidency of the United States
White House Executive Residence Operations
Fife players